Akaky Kaliti (Amharic: አቃቂ ቃሊቲ ክፍለ ከተማ), also spelled Akaki Kality, is a district of Addis Ababa, Ethiopia. As of 2011 its population was of 195,273. Formerly, Akaky Kaliti was known as Woreda 26. 

Many industries are found in this sub-city of Addis Ababa.

Geography
The district is the southernmost suburb of the city and borders with the districts of Nifas Silk-Lafto and Bole. Driving further East (pass the toll highway at Tulu Deemtu), you will enter the Oromia Special Zone Surrounding Finfinne. Once you leave the city of Addis Ababa borders, the first town you will come across will be Galan, and further East will be the town of Dukam.

Notable places
Kaliti Prison, a notorious prison where many journalists are held

Listo of places
 Endorro
 Koye

Admin Level: 10
 Habitate

Admin Level: 1
 Adiss
 Akaki Bota
 Akaki Beseka
 Akaki Kaliti
 Kebena
 Gelan Bota
 Saris
 Saris Abo Area
 Selbane
 Tug Kebena
 Tulu Dimitu

References

External links

Districts of Addis Ababa